Inostroza is a surname. Notable people with the surname include:

 Benjamín Inostroza (born 1997), Chilean footballer
 Diego Inostroza (born 1992), Chilean footballer
 Enrique Inostroza (born 1921), Chilean marathon runner
 Jesús Inostroza (born 1956), Chilean photographer
 Juan Inostroza (1942–1989), Chilean fencer
 Paris Inostroza (born 1972), Chilean fencer
 Raúl Inostroza (1921–1975), Chilean long-distance runner